Convallaria is a genus of flowering plants. It is usually described as a monotypic genus with the single species Convallaria majalis (lily-of-the-valley), but now some botanists distinguish up to three species, also including Convallaria keiskei and Convallaria montana.

The generic name means valley in Botanical Latin, in reference to the plant's natural geographical habitat.

References

Nolinoideae
Asparagaceae genera